The second season of RuPaul's Drag Race premiered on February 1, 2010, and aired its final episode on April 26, 2010. On May 1, 2009, the casting website for the series opened, allowing prospective contestants to create user profiles and upload videos of themselves to be voted on by viewers; the applicant collecting the most votes being invited to become a contestant of the second season. At the end of the online casting period, Jessica Wild had collected the most votes and was announced as being a season two contestant. Filming took place during the summer of 2009.

For season two, the number of contestants was increased from nine to twelve, and the prizes were slightly modified: a lifetime supply of NYX Cosmetics and be the face of nyxcosmetics.com, an exclusive one year public relations contract with LGBT firm Project Publicity, be featured an LA Eyeworks campaign, join the Logo Drag Race tour, and a cash prize of $25,000. A new tradition of writing a farewell message, in lipstick on their workstation mirror, was started by Shangela, the first eliminated queen of the season.
Each week's episode is followed by a behind-the-scenes show, RuPaul's Drag Race Untucked.

The theme song playing during the runway and the end credits every episode is the Gomi and RasJek remix of "Jealous of My Boogie" from RuPaul's album Champion. On December 6, 2011, Amazon.com released this season on DVD via their CreateSpace program.

The winner of the second season of RuPaul's Drag Race was Tyra Sanchez, with Raven being the runner-up.

Contestants

Ages, names, and cities stated are at time of filming.

Notes:

Contestant progress

Lip syncs
Legend:

Guest judges
Listed in chronological order:

Mike Ruiz, photographer
Kathy Griffin, comedian
Kim Coles, actress and comedian
Dita Von Teese, burlesque performer
Kathy Najimy, actress
Tanya Tucker, singer
Lisa Rinna, actress and television personality
Niecy Nash, comedian, actress, and model
Mathu Andersen, make-up artist and photographer
Martha Wash, singer-songwriter
Henry Rollins, musician, actor, and comedian
Terri Nunn, singer and actress
Gigi Levangie, novelist, screenwriter, and producer
Jackie Collins, novelist
Debbie Reynolds, actress and singer
Cloris Leachman, actress and comedian
Toni Ko, CEO of NYX Cosmetics
Tatum O'Neal, actress and author
Marissa Jaret Winokur, actress

Episodes

References

External links
 

2010 American television seasons
RuPaul's Drag Race seasons
2010 in LGBT history